Lefty is a nickname for a left-handed person. 

Lefty may also refer to:

People
Lefty (rapper), American rapper also known as The L.E.F.T., born Paul DeLisle
Lefty Dizz (1937-1993), Chicago blues guitarist and singer born Walter Williams

Art, entertainment, and media

Fictional characters
Lefty, a fictional cowboy character played by Garrison Keillor in the A Prairie Home Companion feature, the adventures of Dusty and Lefty, "The Lives of the Cowboys" 
Lefty the Salesman, a Sesame Street character

Film
Lefty (1964 film), an animated film directed by Ivan Ivanov-Vano
Lefty (1987 film), a feature film directed by Sergei Ovcharov

Literature
 "The Tale of Cross-eyed Lefty from Tula and the Steel Flea" (sometimes called "Lefty"), an 1881 short story by Nikolai Leskov

Music
Lefty (album), a 1988 album by Art Garfunkel
"Lefty", a song from the album Six by Soft Machine

Other uses
Lefty (protein), proteins that are closely related members of the TGF-beta family of growth factors
Lefty shock, a front shock on some Cannondale bicycle wheels
Leftist or lefty, someone who believes in left-wing politics

See also
Righty (disambiguation)